Benjamin Arif Dousa (born 5 December 1992) is a Swedish politician of the Moderate Party. He was the national chairman of the Moderate Youth League from 2016 to 2020. He was re-elected to the position on 24 November 2018.

Life and career 
Dousa was born on December 5, 1992 in Rinkeby, Stockholm.

Dousa was deputy chairman of Rinkeby-Kista City District Board from 2014 to 2018 and has been chairman of the board since 2018.

Dousa served as national chairman of the Moderate School Youth from 2012 to 2013 and as national chairman of the Moderate Students from 2014 of to 2016.

On 11 May 2020, Dousa announced that he would be retiring from the Moderate Youth League and from politics altogether, citing a desire to focus on his career. He will formally resign at the Youth League convention in November He is now CEO of Timbro.

References 

1992 births
Living people
Moderate Party politicians
Swedish people of Czech descent
People from Stockholm